Split-brain or callosal syndrome is a type of disconnection syndrome when the corpus callosum connecting the two hemispheres of the brain is severed to some degree. It is an association of symptoms produced by disruption of, or interference with, the connection between the hemispheres of the brain. The surgical operation to produce this condition (corpus callosotomy) involves transection of the corpus callosum, and is usually a last resort to treat refractory epilepsy. Initially, partial callosotomies are performed; if this operation does not succeed, a complete callosotomy is performed to mitigate the risk of accidental physical injury by reducing the severity and violence of epileptic seizures. Before using callosotomies, epilepsy is instead treated through pharmaceutical means. After surgery, neuropsychological assessments are often performed.

After the right and left brain are separated, each hemisphere will have its own separate perception, concepts, and impulses to act. Having two "brains" in one body can create some interesting dilemmas. When one split-brain patient dressed himself, he sometimes pulled his pants up with one hand (that side of his brain wanted to get dressed) and down with the other (this side did not). He also reported to have grabbed his wife with his left hand and shaken her violently, at which point his right hand came to her aid and grabbed the aggressive left hand. However, such conflicts are very rare. If a conflict arises, one hemisphere usually overrides the other.

When split-brain patients are shown an image only in the left half of each eye's visual field, they cannot vocally name what they have seen. This is because the image seen in the left visual field is sent only to the right side of the brain (see optic tract), and most people's speech-control center is on the left side of the brain. Communication between the two sides is inhibited, so the patient cannot say out loud the name of that which the right side of the brain is seeing. A similar effect occurs if a split-brain patient touches an object with only the left hand while receiving no visual cues in the right visual field; the patient will be unable to name the object, as each cerebral hemisphere of the primary somatosensory cortex only contains a tactile representation of the opposite side of the body. If the speech-control center is on the right side of the brain, the same effect can be achieved by presenting the image or object to only the right visual field or hand.

The same effect occurs for visual pairs and reasoning. For example, a patient with split brain is shown a picture of a chicken foot and a snowy field in separate visual fields and asked to choose from a list of words the best association with the pictures. The patient would choose a chicken to associate with the chicken foot and a shovel to associate with the snow; however, when asked to reason why the patient chose the shovel, the response would relate to the chicken (e.g. "the shovel is for cleaning out the chicken coop").

History 

Early anatomists, such as Galen (129 – c. 216 CE) and Vesalius (1514 – 1564 CE), identified the corpus callosum. They generally described its function as a structure holding together the two halves of the brain. In 1784, Félix Vicq-d'Azyr described the corpus callosum as allowing communication between the two halves of the brain. He proposed that eliminating the corpus callosum would divide the brain into two independent parts. In 1892, Joseph Jules Dejerine reported symptoms in a person who had destruction of part of the corpus callosum (along with damage to the visual cortex: inability to read while retaining the ability to write, now referred to as pure alexia or as Dejerine syndrome. In 1908, Hugo Liepmann observed left-sided apraxia (a motor disorder of motor planning to perform tasks or movements) and agraphia (loss of the ability to communicate through writing) following a lesion in the corpus callosum.

According to Vaddiparti et al. (2021), the first surgical cuts to the corpus callosum, partial corpus callosotomy, were made by neurosurgeon Walter Dandy in order to access and to remove tumors in the pineal gland. In 1936, Dandy described three cases in which he cut the corpus callosum from its posterior (towards the back of the head) across about two thirds of its width. He described these cuts as "bloodless" and that "no symptoms follow[ed] [the] .. division" of the corpus callosum. He concluded that his operations "dispose ... of the extravagant claims to function of the corpus callosum" (p. 40).

Prior to the 1960s, research on people with certain brain injuries led to the notion that there is a "language center" only in the left hemisphere of the brain. For example, people with lesions in two specific areas of the left hemisphere lost their ability to talk, to read, and to understand speech. Roger Sperry and his colleagues pioneered research showing that creating another lesion (done to relieve otherwise untreatable epilepsy), in the connections between the left and right hemispheres, revealed that the right hemisphere can allow people to read, to understand speech, and to say some simple words. Research over the next twenty years showed that the disconnected right hemisphere is superior to the disconnected left hemisphere in allowing people to understand spatial information (such as maps), music, and emotions, whereas the disconnected left hemisphere is superior in allowing analytical thinking, talking, reading, and understanding speech. This research led to a Nobel Prize in Physiology or Medicine for Sperry in 1981.

Sperry's initial colleagues included his Caltech PhD students, Michael Gazzaniga and Jerre Levy. Even though Sperry is considered the founder of split-brain research, Gazzaniga's clear summaries of their collaborative work are consistently cited in psychology texts. In Sperry and Gazzaniga's "The Split Brain in Man" experiment published in Scientific American in 1967 they attempted to explore the extent to which two halves of the human brain were able to function independently and whether or not they had separate and unique abilities. They wanted to examine how perceptual and intellectual skills were affected in someone with a split-brain. At Caltech, Gazzaniga worked with Sperry on the effects of split-brain surgery on perception, vision and other brain functions. The surgery, which was a treatment for severe epilepsy, involved severing the corpus callosum, which carries signals between the left-brain hemisphere, the seat of speech and analytical capacity, and the right-brain hemisphere, which helps recognize visual patterns. At the time this article was written, only ten patients had undergone the surgery to sever their corpus callosum (corpus callosotomy). Four of these patients had consented to participate in Sperry and Gazzaniga's research. After the corpus callosum severing, all four participants' personality, intelligence, and emotions appeared to be unaffected. However, the testing done by Sperry and Gazzaniga showed the subjects demonstrated unusual mental abilities. The researchers created different types of tests to analyze the range of cognitive capabilities of the split-brain subjects. These included tests of their visual stimulation abilities, a tactile stimulation situation, and a test that involved both visual and tactile information.

Visual test 

The first test started with a board that had a horizontal row of lights. The subject was told to sit in front of the board and stare at a point in the middle of the lights, then the bulbs would flash across both the right and left visual fields. When the patients were asked to describe afterward what they saw, they said that only the lights on the right side of the board had lit up. Next, when Sperry and Gazzaniga flashed the lights on the right side of the board on the subjects left side of their visual field, they claimed not to have seen any lights at all. When the experimenters conducted the test again, they asked the subjects to point to the lights that lit up. Although subjects had only reported seeing the lights flash on the right, they actually pointed to all the lights in both visual fields. This showed that both brain hemispheres had seen the lights and were equally competent in visual perception. The subjects did not say they saw the lights when they flashed in the left visual field even though they did see them because the center for speech is located in the brain's left hemisphere. This test supports the idea that in order to say one has seen something, the region of the brain associated with speech must be able to communicate with areas of the brain that process the visual information.

Tactile test 

In a second experiment, Sperry and Gazzaniga placed a small object in the subject's right or left hand, without being able to see (or hear) it. Placed in the right hand, the isolated left hemisphere perceived the object and could easily describe and name it. However, placed in the left hand, the isolated right hemisphere could not name or describe the object. Questioning this result, the researchers found that the subjects could later match it from several similar objects; tactile sensations limited to the right hemisphere were accurately perceived but could not be verbalized. This further demonstrated the apparent location (or lateralization) of language functions in the left hemisphere.

Combination of both tests 

In the last test the experimenters combined both the tactile and visual test. They presented subjects with a picture of an object to only their right hemisphere, and subjects were unable to name it or describe it. There were no verbal responses to the picture at all. If the subject however was able to reach under the screen with their left hand to touch various objects, they were able to pick the one that had been shown in the picture. The subjects were also reported to be able to pick out objects that were related to the picture presented, if that object was not under the screen.

Sperry and Gazzaniga went on to conduct other tests to shed light on the language processing abilities of the right hemisphere as well as auditory and emotional reactions as well. The significance of the findings of these tests by Sperry and Gazzaniga were extremely telling and important to the psychology world. Their findings showed that the two halves of the brain have numerous functions and specialized skills. They concluded that each hemisphere really has its own functions. One's left hemisphere of the brain is thought to be better at writing, speaking, mathematical calculation, reading, and is the primary area for language. The right hemisphere is seen to possess capabilities for problem solving, recognizing faces, symbolic reasoning, art, and spatial relationships.

Roger Sperry continued this line of research up until his death in 1994. Michael Gazzaniga continues to research the split-brain. Their findings have been rarely critiqued and disputed, however, a popular belief that some people are more "right-brained" or "left-brained" has developed. In the mid-1980s Jarre Levy, a psychobiologist at the University of Chicago, had set out and been in the forefront of scientists who wanted to dispel the notion we have two functioning brains. She believes that because each hemisphere has separate functions that they must integrate their abilities instead of separating them. Levy also claims that no human activity uses only one side of the brain. In 1998 a French study by Hommet and Billiard was published that questioned Sperry and Gazzaniga's study that severing the corpus callosum actually divides the hemispheres of the brain. They found that children born without a corpus callosum demonstrated that information was being transmitted between hemispheres, and concluded that subcortical connections must be present in these children with this rare brain malformation. They are unclear about whether these connections are present in split-brain patients though. Another study by Parsons, Gabrieli, Phelps, and Gazzaniga in 1998 demonstrated that split-brain patients may commonly perceive the world differently from the rest of us. Their study suggested that communication between brain hemispheres is necessary for imaging or simulating in your mind the movements of others.  Morin's research on inner speech in 2001 suggested that an alternative for interpretation of commissurotomy according to which split-brain patients exhibit two uneven streams of self-awareness: a "complete" one in the left hemisphere and a "primitive" one in the right hemisphere.

Hemispheric specialization 

The two hemispheres of the cerebral cortex are linked by the corpus callosum, through which they communicate and coordinate actions and decisions. Communication and coordination between the two hemispheres is essential because each hemisphere has some separate functions. The right hemisphere of the cortex excels at nonverbal and spatial tasks, whereas the left hemisphere is more dominant in verbal tasks, such as speaking and writing. The right hemisphere controls the primary sensory functions of the left side of the body. In a cognitive sense the right hemisphere is responsible for recognizing objects and timing, and in an emotional sense it is responsible for empathy, humour and depression. On the other hand, the left hemisphere controls the primary sensory functions of the right side of the body and is responsible for scientific and maths skills, and logic. The extent of specialised brain function by an area remains under investigation. It is claimed that the difference between the two hemispheres is that the left hemisphere is "analytic" or "logical" while the right hemisphere is "holistic" or "intuitive." Many simple tasks, especially comprehension of inputs, require functions that are specific to both the right and left hemispheres and together form a one direction systematised way of creating an output through the communication and coordination that occurs between hemispheres.

Role of the corpus callosum 

The corpus callosum is a structure in the brain along the longitudinal fissure that facilitates much of the communication between the two hemispheres. This structure is composed of white matter: millions of axons that have their dendrites and terminal boutons projecting in both the right and left hemisphere. However, there is evidence that the corpus callosum may also have some inhibitory functions. Post-mortem research on human and monkey brains shows that the corpus callosum is functionally organised. It proves that the right hemisphere is superior for detecting faces. This organisation results in modality-specific regions of the corpus callosum that are responsible for the transfer of different types of information. Research has revealed that the anterior midbody transfers motor information, the posterior midbody transfers somatosensory information, the isthmus transfers auditory information and the splenium transfers visual information. Although much of the interhemispheric transfer occurs at the corpus callosum, there are trace amounts of transfer via subcortical pathways.

Studies of the effects on the visual pathway on split-brained patients has revealed that there is a redundancy gain (the ability of target detection to benefit from multiple copies of the target) in simple reaction time. In a simple response to visual stimuli, split-brained patients experience a faster reaction time to bilateral stimuli than predicted by model. A model proposed by Iacoboni et al. suggests split-brained patients experience asynchronous activity that causes a stronger signal, and thus a decreased reaction time. Iacoboni also suggests there exists dual attention in split-brained patients, which is implying that each cerebral hemisphere has its own attentional system. An alternative approach taken by Reuter-Lorenz et al. suggests that enhanced redundancy gain in the split brain is primarily due to a slowing of responses to unilateral stimuli, rather than a speeding of responses to bilateral ones. It is important to note that the simple reaction time in split-brained patients, even with enhanced redundancy gain, is slower than the reaction time of normal adults.

Functional plasticity 

Following a stroke or other injury to the brain, functional deficiencies are common. The deficits are expected to be in areas related to the part of the brain that has been damaged; if a stroke has occurred in the motor cortex, deficits may include paralysis, abnormal posture, or abnormal movement synergies. Significant recovery occurs during the first several weeks after the injury. However, recovery is generally thought not to continue past 6 months. If a specific region of the brain is injured or destroyed, its functions can sometimes be transferred and taken over by a neighbouring region. There is little functional plasticity observed in partial and complete callosotomies; however, much more plasticity can be seen in infant patients receiving a hemispherectomy, which suggests that the opposite hemisphere can adapt some functions typically performed by its opposite pair. In a study done by Anderson, it proved a correlation between the severity of the injury, the age of the individual and their cognitive performance. It was evident that there was more neuroplasticity in older children, even if their injury was extremely severe, than infants who suffered moderate brain injury. In some incidents of any moderate to severe brain injury, it mostly causes developmental impairments and in some of the most severe injuries it can cause a profound impact on their development that can lead to long-term cognitive effects. In the aging brain, it is extremely uncommon for neuroplasticity to occur; "olfactory bulb and hippocampus are two regions of the mammalian brain in which mutations preventing adult neurogenesis were never beneficial, or simply never occurred" (Anderson, 2005).

Corpus callosotomy 

Corpus callosotomy is a surgical procedure that sections the corpus callosum, resulting in either the partial or complete disconnection between the two hemispheres. It is typically used as a last resort measure in treatment of intractable epilepsy. The modern procedure typically involves only the anterior third of the corpus callosum; however, if the epileptic seizures continue, the following third is lesioned prior to the remaining third if the seizures persist. This results in a complete callosotomy in which most of the information transfer between hemispheres is lost.

Due to the functional mapping of the corpus callosum, a partial callosotomy has less detrimental effects because it leaves parts of the corpus callosum intact. There is little functional plasticity observed in partial and complete callosotomies on adults, the most neuroplasticity is seen in young children but not in infants.

It is known that when the corpus callosum is severed during an experimental procedure, the experimenter can ask each side of the brain the same question and receive two different answers. When the experimenter asks the right visual field/left hemisphere what they see the participant will respond verbally, whereas if the experimenter asks the left visual field/right hemisphere what they see the participant will not be able to respond verbally but will pick up the appropriate object with their left hand.

Memory 

It is known that the right and the left hemisphere have different functions when it comes to memory. The right hemisphere is better at recognizing objects and faces, recalling knowledge that the individual has already learned, or recalling images already seen. The left hemisphere is better at mental manipulation, language production, and semantic priming but was more susceptible to memory confusion than the right hemisphere. The main issue for individuals that have undergone a callosotomy is that because the function of memory is split into two major systems, the individual is more likely to become confused between knowledge they already know and information that they have only inferred.

In tests, memory in either hemisphere of split-brained patients is generally lower than normal, though better than in patients with amnesia, suggesting that the forebrain commissures are important for the formation of some kinds of memory. This suggests that posterior callosal sections that include the hippocampal commissures cause a mild memory deficit (in standardised free-field testing) involving recognition.

Control 

In general, split-brained patients behave in a coordinated, purposeful and consistent manner, despite the independent, parallel, usually different and occasionally conflicting processing of the same information from the environment by the two disconnected hemispheres. When two hemispheres receive competing stimuli at the same time, the response mode tends to determine which hemisphere controls behaviour.

Often, split-brained patients are indistinguishable from normal adults. This is due to the compensatory phenomena; split-brained patients progressively acquire a variety of strategies to get around their interhemispheric transfer deficits. One issue that can happen with their body control is that one side of the body is doing the opposite of the other side called the intermanual effect.

Attention 

Experiments on covert orienting of spatial attention using the Posner paradigm confirm the existence of two different attentional systems in the two hemispheres. The right hemisphere was found superior to the left hemisphere on modified versions of spatial relations tests and in locations testing, whereas the left hemisphere was more object based. The components of mental imagery are differentially specialised: the right hemisphere was found superior for mental rotation, the left hemisphere superior for image generation. It was also found that the right hemisphere paid more attention to landmarks and scenes whereas the left hemisphere paid more attention to exemplars of categories.

Case studies of split-brain patients

Patient WJ 
Patient WJ was the first patient to undergo a full corpus callosotomy in 1962, after experiencing fifteen years of convulsions resulting from grand mal seizures. He was a World War II paratrooper who was injured at 30 years old during a bombing raid jump over the Netherlands, and again in a prison camp following his first injury. After returning home, he began to suffer from blackouts in which he would not remember what he was doing or where, and how or when he got there. At age 37, he suffered his first generalised convulsion. One of his worst episodes occurred in 1953, when he suffered a series of convulsions lasting for many days. During these convulsions, his left side would go numb and he would recover quickly, but after the series of convulsions, he never regained complete feeling on his left side.

Before his surgery, both hemispheres functioned and interacted normally, his sensory and motor functions were normal aside from slight hypoesthesia, and he could correctly identify and understand visual stimuli presented to both sides of his visual field. During his surgery in 1962, his surgeons determined that no massa intermedia had developed, and he had undergone atrophy in the part of the right frontal lobe exposed during the procedure. His operation was a success, in that it led to decreases in the frequency and intensity of his seizures.

Patient JW 

Funnell et al. (2007) tested patient JW some time before June 2006. They described JW as 

Funnell et al.'s (2007) experiments were to determine each of JW's hemisphere's ability to perform simple addition, subtraction, multiplication and division. For example, in one experiment, on each trial, they presented an arithmetic problem in the center of the screen for 1 second, followed by a central cross hair JW was to look at. After 1 more second, Funnell et al. presented a number to one or the other hemisphere/visual field for 150 ms—too fast for JW to move his eyes. Randomly in half the trials, the number was the correct answer; in the other half of the trials it was the incorrect answer. With the hand on the same side as the number, JW pressed one key if the number was correct and another key if the number was incorrect.

Funnell et al.'s results were that performance of the left hemisphere was highly accurate (around 95%)—much better than performance of the right hemisphere, which was at chance for subtraction, multiplication, and division. Nevertheless the right hemisphere showed better than chance performance for addition (around 58%).{}

Turk et al. (2002) tested hemispheric differences in JW's recognition of himself and of familiar faces. They used faces that were composites of JW's face and Dr. Michael Gazzaniga's face. Composites ranged from 100% JW, through 50% JW and 50% Gazzaniga, to 100% Gazzaniga. JW pressed keys to say whether a presented face looked like him or Gazzaniga. Turk et al.concluded there are cortical networks in the left hemisphere that play an important role in self-recognition.

Patient VP 

Patient VP is a woman who underwent a two-stage callosotomy in 1979 at the age of 27. Although the callosotomy was reported to be complete, follow-up MRI in 1984 revealed spared fibers in the rostrum and splenium. The spared rostral fibers constituted approximately 1.8% of the total cross-sectional area of the corpus callosum and the spared splenial fibers constituted approximately 1% of the area. VP's postsurgery intelligence and memory quotients were within normal limits.

One of the experiments involving VP attempted to investigate systematically the types of visual information that could be transferred via VP's spared splenial fibers. The first experiment was designed to assess VP's ability to make between-field perceptual judgements about simultaneously presented pairs of stimuli. The stimuli were presented in varying positions with respect to the horizontal and vertical midline with VP's vision fixated on a central crosshair. The judgements were based on differences in colour, shape or size. The testing procedure was the same for all three types of stimuli; after presentation of each pair, VP verbally responded "yes" if the two items in the pair were identical and "no" if they were not. The results show that there was no perceptual transfer for colour, size or shape with binomial tests showing that VP's accuracy was not greater than chance.

A second experiment involving VP attempted to investigate what aspects of words transferred between the two hemispheres. The set up was similar to the previous experiment, with VP's vision fixated on a central cross hair. A word pair was presented with one word on each side of the cross-hair for 150 ms. The words presented were in one of four categories: words that looked and sounded like rhymes (e.g. tire and fire), words that looked as if they should rhyme but did not (e.g. cough and dough), words that did not look as if they should rhyme but did (e.g. bake and ache), and words that neither looked nor sounded like rhymes (e.g. keys and fort). After presentation of each word pair, VP responded "yes" if the two words rhymed and "no" if they did not. VP's performance was above chance and she was able to distinguish among the different conditions. When the word pairs did not sound like rhymes, VP was able to say accurately that the words did not rhyme, regardless of whether or not they looked as if they should rhyme. When the words did rhyme, VP was more likely to say they rhymed, particularly if the words also looked as if they should rhyme.

Although VP showed no evidence for transfer of colour, shape or size, there was evidence for transfer of word information. This is consistent with the speculation that the transfer of word information involves fibres in the ventroposterior region of the splenium—the same region in which V.P. had callosal sparing. V.P. is able to integrate words presented to both visual fields, creating a concept that is not suggested by either word. For example, she combines "head" and "stone" to form the integrated concept of a tombstone.

Kim Peek 
Kim Peek was arguably the most well-known savant. He was born on November 11, 1951 with an enlarged head, sac-like protrusions of the brain and the membranes that cover it through openings in the skull, a malformed cerebellum, and without a corpus callosum, an anterior commissure, or a posterior commissure. He was able to memorize over 9,000 books, and information from approximately 15 subject areas. These include: world/American history, sports, movies, geography, actors and actresses, the Bible, church history, literature, classical music, area codes/zip codes of the United States, television stations serving these areas, and step by step directions within any major U.S. city. Despite these abilities, he had an IQ of 87, was diagnosed as autistic, was unable to button his shirt, and had difficulties performing everyday tasks. The missing structures of his brain have yet to be linked to his increased abilities, but they can be linked to his ability to read pages of a book in 8–10 seconds. He was able to view the left page of a book with his left visual field and the right page of a book with his right visual fields so he could read both pages simultaneously. He also had developed language areas in both hemispheres, something very uncommon in split-brain patients. Language is processed in areas of the left temporal lobe, and involves a contralateral transfer of information before the brain can process what is being read. In Peek's case, there was no transfer ability—this is what led to his development of language centers in each hemisphere. Many believe this is the reason behind his extremely fast reading capabilities.

Although Peek did not undergo corpus callosotomy, he is considered a natural split-brain patient and is critical to understanding the importance of the corpus callosum. Kim Peek died in 2009.

See also 
 Lateralization of brain function
 Left brain interpreter
 Confabulation
 Brain asymmetry
 Dual consciousness
 Divided consciousness
 Bicameral mentality
 Alien hand syndrome
 Society of Mind
 Parallel computing
 Laterality
 Mind-body problem
 Philosophy of mind
 Theory of mind
 Ideomotor phenomenon
 Cognitive Neuroscience
 Agenesis of the corpus callosum
 Of Two Minds (book)

References 

Neuroscience
Neurosurgical procedures
Brain
Brain asymmetry
Cerebrum
Corpus callosum
Consciousness studies